José Luis García may refer to:

José Luis García Sánchez (born 1941), Spanish film director, screenwriter and producer
José Luis Garci (José Luis García Muñoz, born 1944), Spanish director, producer, critic, TV presenter, screenwriter and author
José Luis García-López (born 1948), Spanish comic book artist
José Luis García Pérez (born 1972), Spanish film, television and theater actor
José Luis García (footballer) (born 1985), Argentine footballer
Recio (footballer) (José Luis García del Pozo, born 1991), Spanish footballer
José Luis García (baseball) [aka Chito] (1924–2015), Mexican baseball player and manager (Tigres de Quintana Roo)
José Luis García (pitcher), Mexican baseball player (2009 Caribbean Series)
Pepelu (José Luis García Vayá, born 1998), Spanish footballer
José Luis García (wrestler), Guatemala Olympic wrestler

See also 
Jose Garcia (disambiguation)